Five Women Wearing the Same Dress is a play written in 1993 by Alan Ball.

Plot
The play is a comedy set at the home of the bride in Knoxville, Tennessee during the newly married couple's ostentatious wedding reception.  The five bridesmaids have found refuge in the room of Meredith, the sister of the bride. The women come to realize that despite their differences, they have more in common with each other than any of them do with the bride.

Characters 
 Meredith Marlowe: The bride's rebellious, pot-smoking younger sister who is very sarcastic and much annoyed with the whole fiasco downstairs. Sporting an outwardly tough attitude, she has a lot of insecurity to hide. Bridesmaid. 
 Georgeanne Darby: Tracy's "ugly sidekick" in high school and college. Has accepted the invitation to be a bridesmaid even though her relationship with Tracy is strained because Tracy's boyfriend had once got her pregnant. Bridesmaid.  
 Trisha: One of Tracy's former friends with a supposed bad reputation; a jaded beauty. Bridesmaid. 
 Frances: The very naive and religious cousin of the bride. Bridesmaid. 
 Mindy McClure: The groom's clumsy and outspoken lesbian sister. Bridesmaid. 
 Tripp Davenport (Griffen Lyle Davenport the Third): An usher who falls for Trisha.  The only male seen in the show.
 Tommy Valentine: Is not seen in the play. However he is Tracy's former fiance and has hit on or slept with all of her bridesmaids and many other unsuspecting women. He leaves the wedding reception with a woman in a backless dress.
 Tracy Marlowe-McClure:  The bride, who is never seen in the play.
 Scott McClure:  The groom, who is also never seen in the play.

Cast and crew

References 

Ball, Alan. Five Women Wearing the Same Dress. New York: Dramatists Play Service, 1993. Print.

External links
Muse Theatre Company, Darlinghurst Theatre, Sydney, Australia directed by Christopher Houghton

Plays by Alan Ball
1993 plays
Plays set in Tennessee